A rectus sheath hematoma is an accumulation of blood in the sheath of the rectus abdominis muscle. It causes abdominal pain with or without a mass.

The hematoma may be caused by either rupture of the epigastric artery or by a muscular tear. Causes of this include anticoagulation, coughing, pregnancy, abdominal surgery and trauma. With an ageing population and the widespread use of anticoagulant medications, there is evidence that this historically benign condition is becoming more common and more serious.

On abdominal examination, people may have a positive Carnett's sign.

Most hematomas resolve without treatment, but they may take several months to resolve.

References

External links 

Digestive diseases